John Doxtader (1760–1801) was a Loyalist in the American Revolution and an officer in British forces. He is best known for commanding the "Invasion of Currytown" in the Mohawk Valley on July 9, 1781. His name is variously spelled Dachstädter, Dachsteder, Docksteder, Dochsteder, etc.

Personal
John (Johannes) Doxtader was born in Stone Arabia, Province of New York (now the Town of Palatine, New York) on December 4, 1760 to Hendrick and Maria Magdalena Dachsteder. The Doxstaders were one of a number of families of German Palatines who settled in the Mohawk Valley from 1708. His younger brother, Frederick Docksteder, would later become a sergeant in William Caldwell's company of Butler's Rangers. Sometime after 1783 John married a woman named Sarah (or Sally, last name unknown), and had at least three sons and two daughters.

American Revolution
In 1776 Doxtader declined to support the Patriot cause and was ordered to be sent to Albany for imprisonment.

He was freed or escaped in 1777 and joined the Loyalist forces, becoming an officer in the Indian Department, and was sent as an agent to the Cayuga.

Invasion of Currytown
On July 9, 1781 Doxtader commanded a force of five hundred Indians and Loyalists in an attack on the frontier settlement of Currytown, in the present-day town of Root, Montgomery County, New York. The town was burned, a number of inhabitants were killed,  and nine prisoners were taken.

The invaders were driven out by forces commanded by Colonel Marinus Willet.

Later life
John Doxtader died at Grand River, in Upper Canada on February 27, 1801.

See also
Cherry Valley massacre
Battle of Johnstown

References

External links

1760 births
1801 deaths
People from Palatine, New York
Loyalist military personnel of the American Revolutionary War
Loyalists in the American Revolution from New York (state)